Strength may refer to:

Physical strength 
Physical strength, as in people or animals
Hysterical strength, extreme strength occurring when people are in life-and-death situations
Superhuman strength, great physical strength far above human capability
A common character attribute in role-playing games

As an abstract or psychological trait 
Character strengths like those listed in the Values in Action Inventory
Virtue, and moral uprightness
Courage or fortitude, in the face of moral, physical, emotional, or social adversity
Persuasion, in an argument
The exercise of willpower
The training of and learned determination and perseverance
Resoluteness of body and mind, physical endurance

Politics and statecraft 
Party strengths, see political party
Military strength

Physics 
 Mechanical strength, the ability to withstand an applied stress or load without structural failure
Compressive strength, the capacity to withstand axially directed pushing forces
Tensile strength, the maximum stress while being stretched or pulled before necking
Shear strength, the ability to withstand shearing
Strength (explosive), the ability of an explosive to move surrounding material
Field strength, the magnitude of a field's vector
Signal strength, the magnitude of an electric field at a reference point
Strength (material), the behavior of solid objects subject to stresses and strains

Music 
Strength (band), a band from Portland, Oregon
Strength (Japanese band), a band from Sendai, Miyagi, Japan
Strength (The Alarm album), 1985
Strength (Enuff Z'nuff album), 1991
Strength, an album by Asiatic Warriors
Strength, an album by Chris Rene
Strength, an album by The RH Factor
Strength, an album by The Violet Burning, 1992
"Strength", a song by the Gear Daddies from their 1988 album Let's Go Scare Al
"Strength", a song by Screaming Jets from their 1997 album World Gone Crazy
"Strength" a song by the band Zebrahead
"Strength" a song by the band Ignite
"Strength" a song by the band Information Society
"Strength" a song by the rapper Eminem
"Strength" a song by the band Abingdon Boys School

Other
Strength (cryptography)
Strength (mathematical logic), in model theory
Strength (Tarot card), numbered either XI or VIII
Strong monad, in category theory in mathematics
, a U.S. Navy ship

See also 

 
 
Strengths and weaknesses (disambiguation)
Power (disambiguation)
Reliability (disambiguation)
Strong (disambiguation)
Stronger (disambiguation)